Rodd Christensen is an American actor who portrayed Spencer the painter on the BBC children's television programme Balamory. He was the show's only non-British lead actor. He is also known for presenting shows for BBC Two.

Christensen was born in Las Vegas, Nevada and trained as an actor. A devout Christian, in 1992 he moved to Scotland, and spent eleven years doing youth work with charity Scripture Union in Fife. Between 2002 and 2005, he appeared in Balamory in the role of Spencer, a painter and musician.

Rodd presented a children’s educational programme called ‘Talkie Time’ for BBC Two, with episodes airing in 2010 and 2011.

In 2012, Rodd starred as a presenter for BBC Two for a programme called ‘Counting With Rodd’, an educational programme teaching children all about maths and numbers.

Christensen is married and has two daughters, one of whom is singer Raylin Joy Christensen. He is a keen photographer.

References

External links
 

Living people
African-American Christians
African-American male actors
American emigrants to Scotland
American male television actors
Male actors from Las Vegas
Year of birth missing (living people)
21st-century African-American people